Labs, labs, or LABS may carry the following meanings:

 labs, a C mathematical function for absolute value
 Labs (people), the inhabitants of the Labëria region in Albania
 Helga Labs (born 1940), East German politician 
 Low Altitude Bombing System, US
 Linear alkyl benzene sulfonate, a salt of a linear alkylbenzenesulfonic acid, used as an anionic surfactant: for example, sodium dodecylbenzenesulfonate

See also
 Lab (disambiguation)